Rokn Azin Khavarmianeh Futsal Club is an Iranian professional futsal club based in Mashhad.

Season to season
The table below chronicles the achievements of the Club in various competitions.

Last updated: 31 July 2022

Notes:
* unofficial titles
1 worst title in history of club

Key

P   = Played
W   = Games won
D   = Games drawn
L   = Games lost

GF  = Goals for
GA  = Goals against
Pts = Points
Pos = Final position

Players

Current squad

Personnel

Current technical staff

Last updated: 11 December 2022

Managers

Last updated: 11 December 2022

Club officials

Last updated: 7 December 2022

References 

Futsal clubs in Iran
Sport in Mashhad
2018 establishments in Iran
Futsal clubs established in 2018